

Events

January events 
 January 1 - John J. Bernet succeeds Frederick D. Underwood as president of the Erie Railroad.

February events 
 February 14 - The Hull Paragon rail accident in England kills 12 people,

April events 
 April 1 - Odawara Express Railway Line, connecting to Shinjuku Station of Tokyo and Odawara Station, via Machida Station route officially completed in Japan.(as predecessor of Odakyu Line)
 April 3 - Yosan Line, Takamatsu to Matsuyama route officially completed in Shikoku Island, Japan.

May events 
 May 15 - The Grand Trunk Western Railroad introduces the Maple Leaf passenger train between Chicago, Illinois and Montreal, Quebec.

June events 
 June 1
 Turkish State Railways formed.
 Aichi Electronic Railway Line,  Atsuta Jingu-mae Station of Nagoya to Toyohashi Station route officially completed in Aichi Prefecture, Japan.(as predecessor of Meitetsu Nagoya Line)
 June 29 - Great Western Railway (England) takes delivery of its first 'King' Class 4-6-0 express passenger steam locomotive from its Swindon Works, No. 6000 King George V.

July events 
 July 6 – , later renamed as Togoshi-kōen Station, in Shinagawa, Tokyo, Japan, opens.
 July 16 - Opening of Romney, Hythe and Dymchurch Railway on the English Channel coast ( of  gauge).

August events 
 August 24 - The Sevenoaks railway accident in England kills 13.
 August 25 - Detroit and Mackinac Railway officially abandons the section from Au Sable River Jct. to Comins and the Curran Branch between Hardy and Beavers.

September events 
 September 1 – The Trunk Line in Norway takes electric traction into use between Oslo and Lillestrøm.
 September 24 – October 15 – Baltimore and Ohio Railroad celebrates its centennial in the Fair of the Iron Horse in Baltimore, Maryland.

October events 
 October 10 - First Maine Central Railroad train over Carlton Bridge ends rail ferry service across the Kennebec River at Bath, Maine.

December events 
 December 3 - Official opening of London Post Office Railway.
 December 30 - The Ginza Line, the oldest subway line in Asia, opens in Tokyo, Japan.

Unknown date events 
 Rail transport in Cameroon extended to Yaoundé.
 American Locomotive Company builds first 4-6-4 tender locomotive, for the New York Central; also, the first 4-8-4, for the Northern Pacific Railroad.
 American Car and Foundry acquires Shippers Car Line.
 Narrow gauge Sandy River and Rangeley Lakes Railroad ends train service to the Rangeley Lakes House destination hotel.
 First Dutch National Railway Museum established.

Births

Deaths

May deaths 
 May 23 - Henry Huntington, nephew of Collis P. Huntington and executive in charge of Pacific Electric Railway in the early part of the 20th century (born 1850).

October deaths 
 October 7 – Godfrey M. Hyams, financier for Deepwater Railway and Tidewater Railway, dies (b. 1859).
 October 16 – David Macpherson, Canadian-born American civil engineer (b. 1854)

November deaths 
 November 17 - Charles Sanger Mellen, president of Northern Pacific Railway 1897-1903 and New Haven Railroad beginning in 1903, dies (born 1852).

References